Hunstanton, also known as Sweet Briar, is a historic plantation house located near Winnsboro, Fairfield County, South Carolina.  It was built about 1850, and is a -story, rectangular, weatherboarded Greek Revival style frame residence on a raised brick basement. It has a rear ell and the front façade features a pedimented porch with paneled wooden pillars.

It was added to the National Register of Historic Places in 1984.

References

Plantation houses in South Carolina
Houses on the National Register of Historic Places in South Carolina
Greek Revival houses in South Carolina
Houses completed in 1850
Houses in Fairfield County, South Carolina
National Register of Historic Places in Fairfield County, South Carolina